Island of Lost Souls is a 2007 Danish fantasy film directed by Nikolaj Arcel.

Plot
The 14-year-old protagonist Lulu moves to a small provincial town with her mother and little brother, where she gets bored and dreams of a more magical world. Suddenly, the little brother is possessed by a spirit. With the help from a rich kid named Oliver, and Ricard, disillusioned clairvoyant and inventor, they fight the dark forces hiding on the island of the lost souls.

Cast 
 Sara Langebæk Gaarmann - Lulu
 Lucas Munk Billing - Sylvester
 Lasse Borg - Oliver
 Nicolaj Kopernikus - Richard
 Lars Mikkelsen - Necromancer
 Anette Støvelbæk - Beate

External links 

2007 films
2007 horror films
Danish horror films
Nimbus Film films
Films directed by Nikolaj Arcel